Ajeenkya DY Patil University (ADYPU) is a private University located in Lohegaon, Pune, Maharashtra, India and belongs to the DY Patil group, a network of educational institutions in India.

President 
Ajeenkya DY Patil is the university's president as well as chairman of Ajeenkya DY Patil Group.

References

External links
 Ajeenkya D.Y. Patil University

Private universities in India
Universities in Maharashtra
Education in Pune
Educational institutions established in 2015
2015 establishments in Maharashtra